William Maurice Macdonald, M.A.(10 August 1783 – 24 June 1862) was the Archdeacon  of Wilts from 1828 until his death, at which time he was also the incumbent at Bishops Cannings, Prebendary of Bitton and a Canon Residentiary at Salisbury Cathedral.

References

1783 births
Alumni of Balliol College, Oxford
Archdeacons of Wilts
1862 deaths